Confidence vote was held by the Electoral College of Pakistan on 1 January 2004. Pervez Musharraf won 658 out of 1,170 votes, and according to Article 41 (8) of the Constitution of Pakistan, was "deemed to be elected" to the office of President until October, 2007.

Results

References

2004
2004 elections in Pakistan
Government of Shaukat Aziz